The Martin 2-0-2 was an airliner introduced in 1947.  The twin piston-engined  fixed-wing aircraft was designed and built by the Glenn L. Martin Company.

Design and development
Glenn L. Martin, president of the company, intended that the Model 2-0-2 would be a replacement for the Douglas DC-3. It was also known as the "Martin Executive".

The first flight of the model was in November 1946. Full civilian certification was gained in August 1947, several months before competing aircraft types. The total production of 2-0-2s and 2-0-2As was 47 aircraft.

The aircraft was not pressurized, but was considered a long-range airliner. The fatal crash in 1948 of Northwest Airlines Flight 421 revealed a serious structural problem in the wings. Structural metal fatigue was the problem in a major wing spar. Alloy 7075-T6 was used, which is susceptible to stress-corrosion cracking and low toughness. The airliner was grounded and modifications were made. The wing components were redesigned and the engines replaced. The changed type was designated the Martin 2-0-2A.

Operational history

On November 13, 1945 Pennsylvania Central Airlines purchased a fleet of 35 Martin 2-0-2s from the Glenn Martin Company for $7,000,000. Two weeks later, Colonial Airlines announced that they would purchase 20 airplanes for $4,000,000, scheduled for delivery in 1947. Early in the next year, Martin announced that Pennsylvania Central Airlines had ordered 15 more 2-0-2s, bringing the total aircraft on order in early January 1947 to 137 aircraft, with a sales value of $27,000,000.
Despite the announcement of these large orders, the contract terms allowed the airlines to cancel them without any penalty. The 2-0-2 was unpressurised, unlike the competing Convair 240. Therefore, as delays in production built up, all airlines except Northwest, TWA, LAN, and LAV cancelled their orders and only 31 2-0-2s and 12 2-0-2As were actually delivered to the airlines. The first scheduled flight was on Northwest between Minneapolis and Chicago on 13 October 1947.

The 2-0-2 was the first airplane subjected to the CAA's then new 'Accelerated Service Test', introduced May 15, 1947. In this test, an airliner was to undergo a rigorous 150-hour test, attempting to squeeze one year's service into a week to 10 days of flying. The 2-0-2 made such a test visiting about 50 cities in 7 days. At each city, comprehensive inspections were made of the aircraft systems to assess how wear or malfunction would occur.

TWA and Northwest, initial customers of the 2-0-2, eventually sold theirs to California Central and Pioneer Airlines. Later, Allegheny Airlines acquired many of the 2-0-2s as part of the company's expansion plans, beginning June 1, 1955. Eventually, they acquired a total of 18 aircraft.

Only one of this type of aircraft is known to survive, at the Aviation Hall of Fame and Museum of New Jersey.

This airliner was eventually developed into the Martin 4-0-4, which was more successful.

Variants
The Martin Company designated the following quantities for the airlines (though not all were built), listed by Martin Model number:

2-0-2twin engine prototype: 3, in 1946
2-0-2FLtwin engine commercial transport, Chile: 4, in 1947
2-0-2NWtwin engine commercial transport, Northwest Airlines: 25, in 1947
2-0-2LAVtwin engine commercial transport, Venezuela: 2, in 1947
2-0-2Atwin engine commercial transport, Trans World Airlines: 21, in 1947
2-0-2Etwin engine commercial transport, Eastern Airlines: 25, in 1947

Operators
♠ original operators

 LAN Chile ♠ (four new delivered, 1947–1948)

 Aeroproveedora

 Japan Air Lines (five leased from Transocean in 1951–1952)

 Servicios Aéreos Baja

 RAPSA Panama

 Admiral Airlines
 Allegheny Airlines (18, 1955–1966)
 California Central Airlines
 Martin Air Transport
 Modern Air Transport
 Northwest Orient Airlines ♠ (25 new delivered, 1947)
 Pacific Air Lines (seven, 1958–1964)
 Pioneer Air Lines (nine, 1952–1960)
 Southeast Airlines (Florida)
 Southwest Airways
 Trans World Airlines ♠ (12 new delivered, 1950)
 Transocean Airlines (15, 1951–1952)

 Linea Aeropostal Venezolana ♠ (two new delivered, 1947)

Accidents and incidents
The Martin 2-0-2 had 13 hull-loss accidents and incidents, of which nine were fatal accidents.
 29 August 1948 – Northwest Airlines Flight 421 crashed after losing a wing near Winona, Minnesota, United States, with 37 fatalities.
 7 March 1950 – Northwest Orient Airlines Flight 307 crashed after hitting a flag pole near Minneapolis-St. Paul, Minnesota, United States, with 15 fatalities including two on the ground.
 13 October 1950 – A Northwest Orient 2-0-2 crashed on a training flight at Almelund, Minnesota, with 6 fatalities.
 7 November 1950 – Northwest Orient Flight 115 crashed into a mountain near Butte, Montana, United States, with 21 fatalities.
 16 January 1951 – Northwest Orient Flight 115 crashed near Reardon, Washington, United States, after sudden unexplained loss of control during cruise. 10 fatalities.
 5 November 1951 – Transocean Air Flight 5763 crashed on approach to Tucumcari, New Mexico, United States, with  one fatality.
 9 April 1952 – Japan Airlines Mokusei (operating as Flight 301 by Northwest Airlines) crashed into Mihara volcano, Ōshima Island, Japan, with 37 fatalities.
 12 January 1955 – Trans World Airlines Flight 694 was destroyed in a midair collision with a Douglas DC-3 near Covington, Kentucky, United States, with 13 fatalities plus two on the DC-3.
 14 November 1955 – A Allegheny Airlines 2-0-2 had a collapsed undercarriage during a training flight, landing at Wilmington-Newcastle Airport and was damaged beyond repair.
 30 December 1955 – A Southwest Airlines 2-0-2 was destroyed in a hangar fire at San Francisco, California, United States.
 21 August 1959 – A Pacific Air Lines 2-0-2A was damaged beyond repair after a ground incident with a C-46 Commando at Burbank, California, United States.
 1 December 1959 – Allegheny Airlines Flight 371 crashed into a mountain on approach Williamsport, Pennsylvania, United States, with 25 fatalities.
 2 November 1963 – An Allegheny Airlines 2-0-2 was damaged beyond repair at Newark, New Jersey, United States.

Specifications (Martin 2-0-2)

See also

Notes

References

External links

 First Martin 202 crash due to metal fatigue. - Aviation Safety Network
 Martin Airliners - Maryland Aviation Museum
 

1940s United States airliners
2-0-2
Low-wing aircraft
Aircraft first flown in 1946
Twin piston-engined tractor aircraft